Attila Busai (born 21 January 1989 in Budapest) is a Hungarian football player who plays for BKV Előre SC.

Club statistics

Updated to games played as of 28 July 2018.

Honours
Ferencvárosi TC
Nemzeti Bajnokság I: 2015–16, runner-up 2014–15
Magyar Kupa: 2014–15, 2015–16, 2016–17
Szuperkupa: 2015, 2016
Ligakupa: 2014–15

References

External links
 http://www.UEFA.com
 Hungarian Football Federation
 MTK Hungária FC

1989 births
Living people
Footballers from Budapest
Hungarian footballers
Hungarian expatriate footballers
Association football midfielders
MTK Budapest FC players
FC Wil players
Ferencvárosi TC footballers
Szolnoki MÁV FC footballers
Diósgyőri VTK players
Nyíregyháza Spartacus FC players
NEROCA FC players
Nyköpings BIS players
BKV Előre SC footballers
Nemzeti Bajnokság I players
I-League players
Hungarian expatriate sportspeople in Switzerland
Hungarian expatriate sportspeople in India
Hungarian expatriate sportspeople in Sweden
Expatriate footballers in Switzerland
Expatriate footballers in India
Expatriate footballers in Sweden